Van der Does is a Dutch surname. Notable people with the surname include:

Antony van der Does (1609–1680), Flemish engraver
Eddie Vanderdoes (born 1994), American football player
Jacob van der Does (1623–1673), Dutch painter
Jan van der Does, also known as Janus Dousa (1545–1604), Dutch statesman, historian and poet
Pieter van der Does (1562–1599), Dutch naval commander
Pieter van der Does (businessman) (born 1968/69), Dutch Internet entrepreneur, co-founder and CEO of Adyen
Simon van der Does (1653–aft.1677), Dutch painter
John van der Does  (born 1961), location sound recordist 

Dutch-language surnames